Alex Asensi (born February 9, 1984), is a photographer and distinguished Pingpongo player in Norway. He has won four official Pingpongo tournaments in Oslo finishing the season 2013–2015 as the top leader of the Norwegian Ranking. He has also finished the season 2014–2015 as the number 2 of the World Biennial Ranking. He played 28 matches, winning 24 of them.

Photographer
Asensi is also a great photographer of this alternative sport, in fact he took pictures at all tournaments in which he has participated.

Official Pingpongo career

2013
Asensi made his debut in this sport in Norway in the tournament played during October 2013 in Kulturhuset i Oslo. He won this tournament defeating the local Tune Aksnes Lian in the final in two sets 14–12 / 11–7. Later in November he played the last tournament of the year losing in QF 8–11 against the Norwegian Kristian Nørgaard. With the points from both tournaments he finished 2013 as the No. 1 of Norway.

2014
He won the first 3 official tournaments of Pingpongo in Norway, reinforcing his top position in both Norwegian and World rankings. In August he reached the semi-final of the VIP Championship, but lost against the Brazilian Ian Correia Sampaio 10–12.

2015
In this year he just participated in a single tournament, being defeated by the local Renate Vea Petterson.

Results

References

External links
 Alex Asensi in PINGPONGO NORGE

1984 births
Living people
Sportspeople from Valencia